AB Aerotransport (ABA) was a Swedish government-owned airline which operated during the first half of the 20th century and was merged into what would become the SAS Group.  ABA was established on 27 March 1924 under the name Aktiebolaget Aerotransport by Carl and Adrian Florman together with Ernst  Linder,  John  Björk  och  Johan  Nilsson. Its first flight was on 2 June 1924 between Stockholm, Sweden and Helsinki, Finland. Needing more funds, it became government-owned in 1935. ABA was merged with Swedish Intercontinental Airlines (SILA) in 1948 and airline operations would ultimately be merged into the international SAS Group in 1950.

History 
In 1925 the company started a route between Stockholm and Berlin in co-operation with Lufthansa and a mail route connecting Stockholm with Malmö, Sweden, Amsterdam, Netherlands and London, England.  Passenger service to Moscow, USSR was begun in the late 1930s.

During World War II ABA tried to maintain their network, but in 1941 the route to Moscow was closed, and the route to Berlin ceased in 1945. During the war ABA had a courier flight between Stockholm and Scotland.  After the German occupation of Europe ABA started new routes to Paris, Oslo and Prestwick.

In June 1948, after a Swedish report, the government-owned ABA and privately owned SILA were merged on a 50-50 basis, to form a new airline named ABA.  SILA had become the Swedish part of SAS in 1946, which at that time only a co-operation between DDL in Denmark and DNL in Norway.  However, on October 1, 1950, representatives from the three airlines signed a consortium agreement where they appointed SAS to run the airline operations and the three national airlines only to be holding companies.

Fleet
ABA was the first airline with three-engine passenger aircraft when in 1925, ABA bought three Swedish Junkers G.24 from AB Flygindustri. During the following years ABA used and bought several different aircraft (e.g. Junkers F.33, F.34, G.23, G.24). For the longer routes a Fokker F.XII was used.

In 1937 ABA became the second European operator of the Douglas DC-3 after KLM. This opened opportunities to fly "longer flights" for example to Moscow. In 1939 ABA started to mark their aircraft with Swedish Air Lines.

The aircraft used in the airline's first flight, a Junkers F.13 registered as S-AAAC and later as SE-AAC, is now on display at the National Museum of Science and Technology in Stockholm.

Accidents and incidents

August 31, 1932 An AB Aerotransport Junkers G.24me (SE-AAE, Svealand) crashed at Tubbergen, Netherlands while attempting a forced landing following engine failure, killing the two crew.
June 9, 1936 An AB Aerotransport Fokker F.XXII (SE-ABA, Lappland) crashed while attempting an emergency landing at Bulltofta Airport following triple engine failure, killing one of 13 on board. The pilot had opened the throttles instead of the propeller pitch control while the engines were in weak mixture, causing the engines to quit.
No wreckage has ever been found.
October 22, 1943 An AB Aerotransport Douglas DC-3-268 (SE-BAG, Gripen) was attacked by a Luftwaffe Junkers Ju 88; the pilot attempted a forced landing at sea, but the aircraft struck cliffs of Hallo Island, killing 13 of 15 on board.
December 4, 1945 An AB Aerotransport Boeing B-17G Flying Fortress struck a hill in Stallarholmen while on approach to Bromma Airport, killing the six crew. The aircraft had been flying too low during the approach.
August 9, 1947 An AB Aerotransport Douglas DC-3F (SE-BAY) overran the runway on landing at Bulltofta Airport, killing one of five on board.
October 26, 1947 AB Aerotransport Flight 1629, a Douglas DC-4-1009 (SE-BBG, Sunnan), struck Mount Hymettus while on approach to Hassani Airport, killing all 44 on board.

See also
SAS Group
 Transport in Sweden

References 

Defunct airlines of Sweden
Airlines established in 1924
Airlines disestablished in 1996
SAS Group
Swedish companies established in 1924
Swedish companies disestablished in 1996